The MENA Tour is a golf tour in the Middle East and North Africa. It was founded in 2011 by the Dubai-based Shaikh Maktoum Golf Foundation.  It was previously affiliated to The R&A and the Arab Golf Federation. The previous iteration of the tour was open to both professionals and amateurs.

In 2016 and 2017, the top five professionals on the Order of Merit received Sunshine Tour cards for the following season, with those 6th to 15th earning entry into the final stage of the Sunshine Tour's Q School. The MENA Tour was included in the Official World Golf Ranking from May 2016, with three points awarded for 54-hole events and five for 72-hole events.

The tour was cancelled in 2018 but started again in 2019, with five events planned for February and March 2019 with a further five in October and November. The schedule was revised in 2020 with all tournaments being played from February to April. Because of the COVID-19 pandemic only 5 events were played. No tournaments were held in 2021. At the end of 2021 the tour announced its intention to merge with the Asian Development Tour in 2023, with a number of co-sanctioned events to be played in 2022. In October 2022, the MENA Tour entered into a "strategic alliance" with LIV Golf; the arrangement was conceived in order to immediately afford LIV Golf events Official World Golf Ranking points.

Order of Merit winners

Notes

References

External links

Professional golf tours